William Boyd McCleary  (born 30 March 1949) is a retired member of HM Diplomatic Service originally from Belfast, Northern Ireland.

In September 2010 he was appointed by Queen Elizabeth II on the advice of the British government, to represent the Queen as Governor of the British Virgin Islands, and to act as the de facto head of state in the Territory. Prior to his appointment as governor, McCleary served as High Commissioner to Malaysia from 2006 to 2010.

Shortly after his arrival in the British Virgin Islands, the territory was damaged by Hurricane Earl. Although at the time of his appointment, there was a degree of tension over constitutional matters between the United Kingdom and the British Virgin Islands, McCleary won plaudits in the local press for his deft handling of the situation.  Currently, he is on the advisory board of OMFIF where he is regularly involved in meetings regarding the financial and monetary system. Previously, he was also one of the patrons of the British Theatre Playhouse, a company aiming to produce British theatrical plays and musical shows.

References

Offices

External links
Boyd McCleary CMG, CVO, Governor to the British Virgin Islands

1949 births
Living people
Alumni of Queen's University Belfast
Governors of the British Virgin Islands
High Commissioners of the United Kingdom to Malaysia
Commanders of the Royal Victorian Order
Companions of the Order of St Michael and St George
Civil servants from Belfast
21st-century British diplomats